Body Hits is a TV series which focused on what goes on inside people's bodies as they fight their way through their hectic modern lifestyle. Dr. John Marsden was the show's host for its entirety. The programme aired on BBC Three in the United Kingdom; TechTV (later G4techTV) in the United States; The LifeStyle Channel, ABC1 (as part of Catalyst) and ABC2 in Australia; and Prime Television in New Zealand.

Series 1 (seven episodes) and 2 (six episodes) first aired on BBC Three in 2003, with series 3 (six episodes) following in 2005.

Episodes

References

External links 
 

TechTV original programming
2003 British television series debuts
2005 British television series endings
BBC television documentaries about science